Ray Smith (born c. 1937) is a former Canadian football player who played for the Saskatchewan Roughriders. He previously played football at the University of California, Los Angeles.

References

External links
College stats

Living people
1930s births
Players of American football from Los Angeles
American football halfbacks
Canadian football running backs
American players of Canadian football
UCLA Bruins football players
Saskatchewan Roughriders players
Players of Canadian football from Los Angeles